The Steve Spots is a thirty-six episode television show that aired on WSMV-TV in Nashville, Tennessee. Created by director David Van Hooser, each episode dealt with the “trials and tribulations” of Steve played by actor Chambers Stevens. The show aired during the 1987-88 television season. Originally conceived as a twelve part series Van Hooser wrote thirty-six episodes.
When the show was cancelled an out pouring of community support  forced the station to create The Parent Zone. Zone was a TV special with the same characters as The Steve Spots.

References

1987 American television series debuts
1988 American television series endings
1980s American teen drama television series
Local television programming in the United States